Ladislav Lipič (born 30 November 1951 in Murska Sobota) is a Slovene major general, who in his career was:
 Deputy Chief of the General Staff of the Slovenian Armed Forces (1 December 2000 - January 2001);
 State Secretary at the Ministry of Defence of the Republic of Slovenia (January - 1 March 2001);
 Chief of the General Staff of the Slovenian Armed Forces (from 1 March 2001 to 2006);
 Ambassador Extraordinary and Plenipotentiary of the Republic of Slovenia to the Republic of Hungary and the Republic of Bulgaria with its seat in Budapest (2006–2008)
 Adviser to the President of the Republic Slovenia (Danilo Türk) on defence matters (5 December 2008 - 2012).

He is also a veteran of the Slovenian War.

Orders and decorations 
 Slovenia
 Gold Medal of General Maister with Swords
 Gold Medal of General Maister
 Gold Medal of the Slovenian Armed Forces
 Golden Order for Services in the Military or Security Field of the Republic of Slovenia

 France
 Chevalier de la Légion d'Honneur

 Hungary
 Knight of Hungarian Culture (2003)

 USA
 Legion of Merit (2004)

References

See also 
 Military of Slovenia

1951 births
Living people
Slovenian generals
Chiefs of the General Staff (Slovenia)
Slovenian diplomats
People from Murska Sobota
Recipients of the Legion of Merit
Ambassadors of Slovenia to Hungary